This is the complete list of Asian Games medalists in golf from 1982 to 2018.

Men

Individual

Team

Women

Individual

Team

References

Golf
medalists